Jeffrey Lawton, FRNCM (11 December 1938 – 4 May 2018), was a tenor best known as an international opera singer. He began his career as a student at the Royal Manchester College of Music and from 1982 to 1987 was principal tenor with the Welsh National Opera Company.  Lawton also sang with Opera North and the Scottish Opera. On one occasion in 1990 he substituted for the ill Plácido Domingo in the role of Otello at the Royal Opera, London under Carlos Kleiber. As well as singing at various British festivals and the BBC Proms at the Royal Albert Hall, other pursuits included president of the Wagner Society Manchester and patron of the Oldham Choral Society. Lawton was a tutor and a Fellow of the Royal Northern College of Music (FRNCM).

Selected performances

Welsh National Opera
 Otello - Otello, 1986   
 The Trojans - Aeneas, 1987 
 Die Frau ohne Schatten - The Emperor, 1989 
 Tristan und Isolde - Tristan, 1993

Opera North
 Wozzeck - Captain, 1993 
 Tannhäuser - Tannhäuser, 1997 
 Der Kuhhandel -  President Mendez, 2006

Scottish Opera
 The Greek Passion - Panait Katerina's lover, 1990 
 Tristan und Isolde - Tristan a Cornish knight, 1994 & 1998
 Inés de Castro - Pedro Crown Prince of Portugal, 1996 
 Peter Grimes - Peter Grimes a fisherman, 1997
 Die Meistersinger von Nürnberg - Balthasar Zorn a pewterer, 2006

Royal Opera House
 Der Ring des Nibelungen, Siegfried - Siegfried, 1986 
 Otello - Otello, 1990 
 Elektra - Aegisth, 1994

Film appearances
 Othello TV film, Production company BBC, Broadcaster ZDF, 1985 
 After Moscow, Production company Euston Films, 1983

References

20th-century British male opera singers
English operatic tenors
People from Oldham
Alumni of the Royal Northern College of Music
1939 births
2018 deaths